The Motorola G5 project was an unsuccessful attempt around 2000-2001 to create a 64-bit PowerPC processor, as a successor to Motorola's PowerPC 7400 series. On roadmaps from the era it was designated PowerPC 7500.

It has been suggested that Motorola had a working "G5" chip, but said chip failed in the early stages of mass production and thus could not be widely made into a usable chip.

When Apple began producing 64-bit systems under the G5 brand, they used IBM's PowerPC 970, which is also known as the PowerPC G5.

See also
 AIM alliance
 ppc64
 PowerPC e700
 PWRficient

External links
 The Register – Motorola completes 1.6GHz PowerPC G5
 Architosh – Details on Motorola G5 Emerge

PowerPC microprocessors
Motorola microprocessors